Kara Anne Kennedy (February 27, 1960 – September 16, 2011) was a member of the American political family, the Kennedy family. She was the oldest of the three children and only daughter of U.S. Senator Ted Kennedy from Massachusetts and Joan Bennett Kennedy, and a niece of President John F. Kennedy and Senator Robert F. Kennedy. Kara Kennedy served on the boards of numerous charities and was a filmmaker and television producer. She died of a heart attack in 2011 at the age of 51.

Early life and education
Kara Anne Kennedy was born in 1960 to Joan and Ted Kennedy in Bronxville, New York. In his book True Compass, Senator Kennedy wrote about his joy at her birth: "I had never seen a more beautiful baby nor been more happy." Her siblings were Edward Moore Kennedy, Jr. (born 1961), and Patrick Joseph Kennedy II (born 1967). She spent her early years in Virginia and Cape Cod, Massachusetts. She attended the National Cathedral School in Washington, D.C. and Trinity College, Hartford. Kennedy graduated from Tufts University in Medford, Massachusetts.

Career
After graduating from the National Cathedral School in 1978, Kennedy worked on her father's 1980 Presidential campaign before matriculating at Tufts University. Following the receipt of her degree in 1983, she pursued a career in television, working at Fox News in New York. She also was a producer for the television program Evening Magazine at station WBZ-TV in Boston.

With her brother Ted, Kennedy co-managed her father's successful 1988 re-election campaign.

Kennedy produced films for VSA arts, formerly known as Very Special Arts, an organization founded by her aunt Jean Kennedy Smith to encourage participation in the arts by persons with disabilities. One of Kennedy's best known projects was a film she produced on Chris Burke, the actor with Down syndrome who starred in the television series Life Goes On. She revealed that the film project had as much of a positive impact on her as it did on the viewing audience.

Kennedy served as a director emerita and a national trustee of the John F. Kennedy Library Foundation, a non-profit organization that provides financial support, staffing, and creative resources for the John F. Kennedy Presidential Library and Museum, the presidential library and museum of U.S. President John F. Kennedy in Boston, Massachusetts.

Kennedy also gave her time to Sibley Hospital, and to the women of the N Street Village in Washington, D.C. She served as a board member of the Edward M. Kennedy Institute for the United States Senate where she co-produced a film about the Institute that was shown at its inaugural groundbreaking event. Kennedy was a reading tutor and was preparing to join the Board of Reading Partners at the time of her death.

Kennedy was on the National Advisory Board of the National Organization on Fetal Alcohol Syndrome (NOFAS).

Personal life

On September 9, 1990, Kennedy and Michael Allen, an architect and real estate developer from Rhode Island, were married at the Our Lady of Victory Church in Centerville, on Cape Cod, Massachusetts, a frequent site of Kennedy family events. When she married, Kennedy dropped her middle name "Anne" and replaced it with her maiden name "Kennedy" as her new middle name. They had two children: Grace Kennedy Allen (born September 19, 1994, in Washington, D.C.) and Max Greathouse Allen (born December 20, 1996, in Rockville, Maryland). They were divorced after 11 years of marriage.

In 2002, at age 42, Kennedy was diagnosed with lung cancer. Initially told the disease was inoperable, she found — with her father's help — a surgeon at the Brigham and Women's Hospital in Boston, who was willing to remove part of her right lung in an effort to save her life. The operation was successful, and she resumed an active life that included regular running and swimming.

On August 12, 2009, Kennedy accepted the Presidential Medal of Freedom from President Barack Obama on behalf of her father at a ceremony in Washington, D.C. Her father died 13 days later; he had been diagnosed with brain cancer in May 2008.

In April 2011, Kennedy wrote an article for The Boston Globe Magazine about her family life growing up and her father's influence on her. Kennedy revealed her close relationship with her father, and the role he played in helping her to wage her battle against lung cancer.

Death
On September 16, 2011, two years after her father's death, Kennedy suffered a fatal heart attack in a Washington, D.C. health club after her daily workout. She was 51. The incident has been cited as another example of the Kennedy curse.

She is interred at Holyhood Cemetery in Brookline, Massachusetts alongside her paternal grandparents, Rose and Joseph Kennedy.

See also
 Kennedy family tree

References

External links

 
 

1960 births
2011 deaths
Kara
People from Bronxville, New York
Ted Kennedy
Tufts University alumni
National Cathedral School alumni
Burials at Holyhood Cemetery (Brookline)